Zaer Abbas (also Romanized as Zā’er ‘Abbās; also known as Zā’er ‘Abbāsī) is a village in Khvormuj Rural District, in the Central District of Dashti County, Bushehr Province, Iran. At the 2006 census, its population was 46, in 18 families.

References 

Populated places in Dashti County